Kim So-hui (Hangul: 김소희; ; born January 29, 1994) is a South Korean taekwondo practitioner. In 2016, she is ranked 10th by the World Taekwondo Federation.

Career
Kim won the gold medal in the women's finweight (under 46 kg) class at the 2011 World Taekwondo Championships in Gyeongju, South Korea, as a high schooler. Two years later she became the finweight world champion for the second time in a row at the 2013 World Taekwondo Championships in Puebla, Mexico, defeating Anastasia Valueva of Russia 8–7 in the final bout.
In the 2016 Rio Olympics Kim won her first Olympic Gold Medal in the 49 kg division. Three of her final matches were won convincingly through last second attacks and scoring.

References

External links 
 

1994 births
Living people
South Korean female taekwondo practitioners
Olympic taekwondo practitioners of South Korea
Asian Games medalists in taekwondo
Taekwondo practitioners at the 2014 Asian Games
Asian Games gold medalists for South Korea
Taekwondo practitioners at the 2016 Summer Olympics
Medalists at the 2016 Summer Olympics
Olympic gold medalists for South Korea
Olympic medalists in taekwondo
Medalists at the 2014 Asian Games
World Taekwondo Championships medalists
Asian Taekwondo Championships medalists
People from Jecheon
Sportspeople from North Chungcheong Province
21st-century South Korean women